Anqing Tianzhushan Airport  is a dual-use military and civil airport serving the city of Anqing in Anhui Province, China. In 1991 the national government approved the conversion of the military Anqing Air Base to a dual-use airport. With an investment of 28 million yuan, the airport was opened to civil flights in December 1993. In 2005 HNA Group (parent of Hainan Airlines) took over the management of the airport and renamed it Anqing Tianzhushan Airport, after the nearby tourist destination Tianzhushan (Mount Tianzhu).

New airport

Due to the limitations of the current dual-use military and civil airport, a new dedicated civil airport is being planned to be built by 2017.

Airlines and destinations

See also
List of airports in China
List of the busiest airports in China
List of People's Liberation Army Air Force airbases

References

Airports in Anhui
Chinese Air Force bases
Airports established in 1993
1993 establishments in China
Buildings and structures in Anqing